Hayley Lauder (born 4 June 1990) is a Scottish professional footballer who plays for Glasgow City of the Scottish Women's Premier League and the Scotland women's national team. After beginning her senior career with Spartans, she played for Apollon Limassol in the 2011–12 Champions League qualifying stage. Lauder then moved on to Finland, with Åland United, before spending a single season with both Mallbackens IF and Vittsjö GIK of the Swedish Damallsvenskan.

Club career
Lauder came through the ranks at Murieston Girls. She switched to Spartans Women—then called Edinburgh Ladies—in August 2007.

Apollon Limassol
In August 2011, Lauder joined Apollon Limassol for their 2011–12 UEFA Women's Champions League campaign. During her first appearance for the club on 11 August, she scored a hat-trick helping Limassol defeat Progrès Niedercorn 14–0. Two days later, she scored a brace against Swansea City contributing to an 8–0 rout. Her third and final appearance occurred on 16 August when Limassol defeated Legenda 2–1. In her three appearances, she contributed five goals and played for a total of 227 minutes. The club was eliminated from the tournament in the 16th finals after being defeated a 3–4 aggregate by Czech Republic side, Sparta Praha.

Åland United
Lauder agreed to a one-year professional contract with Finnish Naisten Liiga side Åland United in February 2012. During a match against ONS on 22 September, she scored a hat-trick during the team's 6–0 win. She scored a brace on 29 September during the club's 6–0 win over TPS. She scored her second brace of the season on 21 July against ONS helping Åland United win 7–0. In her 26 appearances for the club, she scored a total of 18 goals, including the hat-trick and four braces. Åland United finished second during the regular season just two points shy of first place team PK-35.

Mallbackens IF
After joining fellow Scotland national team players Emma Mitchell and Jane Ross for trials in Sweden during the 2012 close season, Lauder agreed to join Damallsvenskan newcomers Mallbackens IF in December 2012.

Vittsjö GIK
With Mallbackens IF relegated at the end of the 2013 Damallsvenskan season, Lauder signed for Vittsjö GIK in December 2013, joining fellow Scottish internationals, Jane Ross and Ifeoma Dieke at the club.

Glasgow City
In December 2014 Lauder agreed a return to Scottish football with reigning champions Glasgow City. She was available to play in City's UEFA Women's Champions League upcoming quarter-final tie against Paris Saint-Germain Féminines.

International career
Having played at youth level, including at the 2008 UEFA Women's Under-19 Championship finals, Lauder made her senior Scotland debut in March 2010, against Italy in the Cyprus Cup. She scored her first goal for the national team five days later; in a 2–1 win over South Africa at the same tournament.

In February 2011, Lauder scored twice in a 4–2 win over Wales in Haverfordwest. At the 2011 Cyprus Cup, Lauder provided the cross for Jen Beattie to score Scotland's second goal in their 2–0 win over England. She has also deputised at full-back for the national side, to cover for injuries to regular defensive players.

She made her 100th appearance for Scotland on 14 June 2019, during the 2019 FIFA Women's World Cup.

International goals
Results list Scotland's goal tally first.

See also
 List of women's footballers with 100 or more caps
 Scottish FA Women's International Roll of Honour

References

External links

1990 births
Living people
Scottish women's footballers
Scotland women's international footballers
Sportspeople from Livingston, West Lothian
Damallsvenskan players
Scottish expatriate women's footballers
Apollon Ladies F.C. players
Åland United players
Glasgow City F.C. players
Kansallinen Liiga players
Mallbackens IF players
Vittsjö GIK players
Expatriate women's footballers in Cyprus
Expatriate women's footballers in Finland
Expatriate women's footballers in Sweden
Scottish Women's Premier League players
Women's association football wingers
Spartans W.F.C. players
2019 FIFA Women's World Cup players
Footballers from West Lothian
FIFA Century Club
UEFA Women's Euro 2017 players